The Hong Kong women's national under-18 basketball team is a national basketball team of Hong Kong, governed by the China Hong Kong Basketball Association.
It represents the country in international under-18 (under age 18) women's basketball competitions.

See also
Hong Kong women's national basketball team
Hong Kong women's national under-16 basketball team
Hong Kong men's national under-18 basketball team

References

External links
 Archived records of Hong Kong team participations

Basketball in Hong Kong
Basketball teams in Hong Kong
Women's national under-18 basketball teams
Basketball